The 1993 Richmond Spiders football team was an American football team that represented the University of Richmond as a member of the Yankee Conference during the 1993 NCAA Division I-AA football season. In their fifth season under head coach Jim Marshall, Richmond compiled a 5–6 record, with a mark of 3–5 in conference play, finishing in fourth place in the Mid-Atlantic division of the Yankee.

Schedule

References

Richmond
Richmond Spiders football seasons
Richmond Spiders